Aivar Rehemaa (born 28 September 1982) is an Estonian cross-country skier. He competed at the 2006 Winter Olympics in Turin. He represented Estonia at the 2010 Winter Olympics in Vancouver. His best finish at the Winter Olympics is 10th in the 4×10 km relay in 2014.

Rehemaa's best finish at the FIS Nordic World Ski Championships was eighth on three occasions (Team Sprint: 2009, 4×10 km relay: 2003, 2009). His best World Cup finish was eighth at a 15 km event in Italy in 2009.

He is a junior world champion of 2002 Schonach's 30 km classical mass-start.

References

External links
 
 
 
 

1982 births
Cross-country skiers at the 2006 Winter Olympics
Cross-country skiers at the 2010 Winter Olympics
Cross-country skiers at the 2014 Winter Olympics
Estonian male cross-country skiers
Tour de Ski skiers
Living people
Olympic cross-country skiers of Estonia
Sportspeople from Tartu
21st-century Estonian people